Sycettidae is a family of calcareous sponges in the order Leucosolenida.

References
http://www.marinespecies.org/aphia.php?p=taxdetails&id=131617 accessed 11 November 2010
Sycettidae at Encyclopedia of Life

Leucosolenida